Gabriela Edith Sánchez Grossi (born October 27, 1962) is a retired Argentinian field hockey player. She was part of the Argentina national team that competed at the Summer Olympics in 1988 and 1996. Sánchez won gold medals at the 1987 and 1995 Pan American Games.

References

External links
 

1962 births
Living people
Las Leonas players
Argentine female field hockey players
Field hockey players at the 1988 Summer Olympics
Field hockey players at the 1996 Summer Olympics
Olympic field hockey players of Argentina
Pan American Games gold medalists for Argentina
Pan American Games medalists in field hockey
Field hockey players at the 1987 Pan American Games
Field hockey players at the 1995 Pan American Games
Medalists at the 1995 Pan American Games
Medalists at the 1987 Pan American Games